Emilio Jiménez Gallego (2 November 1923 - 12 July 1987), known as Emilio el Moro, was a Spanish Flamenco singer, guitarist and humorist.

Biography

First Years 
Emilio Jiménez Gallego was born in Melilla in 1923. He was a fan of Flamenco from childhood, and in 1939 at fifteen years of age, he performed in public for the first time, and then went on to consecutively win seven singing competitions, performing different genres, like fandangos, soleás, tientos, polos or cañas. He became the most promising singer of flamenco in North Africa. Charming and a joker, he one day sang Flamenco in an Arabic style, and received such an ovation that he then decided to create the character of Emilio el Moro.

References

External links 
Algunas publicaciones sobre Emilio el Moro

1924 births
1987 deaths
Spanish guitarists
Spanish male guitarists
Spanish comedians
People from Melilla
20th-century Spanish singers
20th-century guitarists
20th-century comedians
20th-century Spanish male singers